Television lines (TVL) is a specification of an analog camera or monitor's horizontal image resolution. The TVL is one of the most important resolution measures in a video system. The TVL can be measured with the standard EIA 1956 resolution chart.

Definition
TVL is defined as the maximum number of alternating light and dark vertical lines that can be resolved per picture height. A resolution of 400 TVL means that 200 distinct dark vertical lines and 200 distinct white vertical lines can be counted over a horizontal span equal to the height of the picture.

TVL is an inherent quality of a camera or monitor, influenced by the visual bandwidth of the transmission system used. It should not be confused with the number of horizontal scanning lines of such systems, which e.g. 625 lines for the PAL system, 525 lines for the NTSC system.

Limitations
Since analog transmission of video is scan line-based, the same number of horizontal lines is always transmitted. However, several factors impede the ability to display fine detail within a line:

 The camera or other source of material.
 The storage and processing of the picture.
 The transmission of the TV signal e.g. broadcast by radio or by cable.
 The reception and reproduction of the picture on a TV set.

See also
Kell factor, which limits the vertical resolution in analog television, and both horizontal and vertical resolution in digital television, to a fraction of the number of scan lines or pixels

References

Television technology